The COVID-19 pandemic was confirmed to have reached the Ukrainian territory of Crimea (claimed and occupied by Russia as the Republic of Crimea, but recognised as a part of Ukraine by most of the international community as the Autonomous Republic of Crimea) in March 2020. The Russian government includes cases in the Republic of Crimea in the count of cases in Russia.

Background 
On 12 January 2020, the World Health Organization (WHO) confirmed that a novel coronavirus was the cause of a respiratory illness in a cluster of people in Wuhan City, Hubei Province, China, which was reported to the WHO on 31 December 2019.

The case fatality ratio for COVID-19 has been much lower than SARS of 2003, but the transmission has been significantly greater, with a significant total death toll.

Timeline

March 2020
On 21 March, the first case was confirmed.

May 2020
As of May 11, the Russian head of Crimea reported 126 COVID-19 cases in the city of Sevastopol and 202 cases in the rest of the peninsula, for 328 cases in total.

July 2020
According to the Crimean Human Rights Group, on July 10, 2020, there were ten new cases in Crimea including Sevastopol. The total count during the pandemic was 1,089 with 37 deaths.

See also
 COVID-19 pandemic in Sevastopol
 COVID-19 pandemic in Russia
 COVID-19 pandemic in Ukraine

References

Crimea
Crimea
Crimea
History of Crimea
Disasters in Crimea